Nyctimene  is a genus of bats in the Pteropodidae family. Commonly known as tube-nosed fruit bats, they are found in the central Philippines, eastern Indonesia, Papua New Guinea and the north-east coast of Australia.

Taxonomy 
The genus was erected by Moritz Balthasar Borkhausen in 1797. The name Nyctimene, derived from Ancient Greek, means 'night moon'.

Description 
The facial features of the species are distinguished by projecting nostrils, rather than the simple features of most other megabats, the appearance of which has been likened to a frightened horse.

Species
The recognised taxa are named in the vernacular as tube-nosed fruit bats or tube-nosed bats, and includes the following
 Broad-striped tube-nosed bat, Nyctimene aello
 Common tube-nosed bat, Nyctimene albiventer
 Pallas's tube-nosed bat, Nyctimene cephalotes
 Dark tube-nosed bat, Nyctimene celaeno
 Mountain tube-nosed bat, Nyctimene  certans
 Round-eared tube-nosed bat, Nyctimene cyclotis
 Dragon tube-nosed bat, Nyctimene draconilla
 Keast's tube-nosed bat, Nyctimene keasti
 Island tube-nosed bat, Nyctimene major
 Malaita tube-nosed bat, Nyctimene malaitensis
 Demonic tube-nosed bat, Nyctimene masalai
 Lesser tube-nosed bat, Nyctimene  minutus
 Philippine tube-nosed bat, Nyctimene rabori
 Eastern tube-nosed bat, Nyctimene robinsoni
 Nendo tube-nosed bat, Nyctimene sanctacrucis
 Umboi tube-nosed bat, Nyctimene vizcaccia
 New Guinea tube-nosed bat, Nyctimene wrightae

References

Further reading
Taxonomy browser (Nyctimene)
Biography for Nyctimene
The mammals on our stamps. Descriptions of the mammals featured on Papua New Guinea's October 1980 stamps issue.
Taxonomic status of Nyctimene (Chiroptera: Pteropodidae) from the Banda, Kai and Aru Islands, Maluku, Indonesia - implications for biogeography.
Electrophoretic resolution of species boundaries in tube-nosed bats (Chiroptera: Pteropodidae) in Australia and Papua New Guinea.
Notes on distribution and taxonomy of Australasian bats. I. Pteropodinae and Nyctimeninae (Mammalia, Megachiroptera, Pteropodidae).
Markedly discordant mitochondrial DNA and allozyme phylogenies of tube-nosed fruit bats, Nyctimene, at the Australian-oriental biogeographical interface.

 
Bat genera
Taxa named by Constantine Samuel Rafinesque